Ryan Ponder McNamara (born 1979) is an American artist known for fusing dance, theater, and history into situation-specific, collaborative performances. McNamara has held performances and exhibitions at Art Basel, The High Line, Dallas Symphony Orchestra, The Whitney Museum, MoMA P.S.1, and The Kitchen amongst other places.

Early life and education 
McNamara was born and raised in Arizona.

He studied photography at Arizona State University and graduated with a MFA at Hunter College in New York City.

Work 
McNamara typically works in with sculpture, drawing, video, and performance. The artist has described his work as "under-your-bed" art and, more recently, image-heavy collaborative performances nicknamed "readymade choreography." Writer and critic Alex Fialho notes that the artist often uses "the stage as a medium in itself."

McNamara participated in the 2nd Athens Biennale in 2009 with a video work titled, "I Thought It Was You." The work featured two screens portraying the artist enacting a spontaneous dance alongside a Herbie Hancock recording.

In 2010, the artist performed one of his most ambitious projects to date: “Make Ryan a Dancer.” Over the length of five months and under public scrutiny and surveillance, the artist took to the task of learning ballet, contact improvisation, and exotic dancing, amongst other dance styles, at MoMA PS1.

McNamara's solo show at Elizabeth Dee gallery in 2012, "Still," transformed the gallery space into a chaotic trompe l'oeil photography studio. The studio included backdrops and props, found objects, set pieces and costumes, and rolling cameras overseen by the artist and assistants. The eerie and improvisational images invoked the surrealist impulses of artists Lucas Samaras and Jimmy DeSana. Later that summer, McNamara and artists K8 Hardy, T.M. Davy, and Paul Sepuya attended BOFFO, a queer arts and performance residency on Fire Island founded by architect Faris Saad Al-Shathir.

In 2013, McNamara was named the winner of Performa 2013’s Malcolm McLaren Award. Titled, "MEEM: A Story Ballet About the Internet," the thirty-one dancers and performance ensemble re-enacted various internet clips featuring George Balanchine, “West Side Story,” Janet Jackson, K-pop, and more.

Curated by Piper Marshall, McNamara's 2015 show, "Gently Used," repurposed costumes from previous performances and gallery lighting into campy and ambitious sculptural and time-based works. Later that same year, McNamara collaborated with musician Dev Hynes for a one night-only performance, "Dimensions," that fused dance, soul, and opera into a kaleidoscopic meditation at the Perez Art Museum.

In 2016, McNamara's re-purposed MoMA PS1 back into a choreographed school. The piece, titled "Ryan McNamara Presents: Back to School," rooms and viewing spaces were emptied out and turned into classrooms; performers acted as teachers, administrators, goths, preps, jocks, and cheerleaders.

For part of the Works & Process series at the Guggenheim Museum in 2017, McNamara collaborated with John Zorn to re-stage a commedia dell'arte that included just under a dozen dancers, a jazz trio, an a cappella quartet, and the nooks and crannies of the museum space itself. Roberta Smith of the New York Times writes of McNamara's performances as an, "increasingly impressive transition from performance art to choreography."

The following year, McNamara performed an updated iteration of his ME3M performance, "ME3M 4 Boston," at the ICA Boston. That same year, he performed "Battleground" at the Guggenheim Museum. "Battleground" was one of McNamara's most ambitious projects to date. For the piece, McNamara collaborated with nine contemporary dancers, including Reid Bartelme, Jason Collins, Dylan Crossman, Fana Fraser, John Hoobyar, Kyli Kleven, Sigrid Lauren, Mickey Mahar, and Brandon Washington. The dancers partook in a cosplay-battle-ballet choreographed for the idiosyncratic architecture of the theater at the Guggenheim. Audience members acted as witnesses to the three groups' battle in "The Red Choir Loft," "The Green Balcony," and "The Blue Stage."

In 2018, McNamara showed a collection of goopy sculptures and dolls for an exhibition at ASHES/ASHES called, "I.L.L.I.S. & I.S.L.I.F. (It Looks Like It Sounds & It Sounds Like It Feels)."

For the 2019 BOFFO Performance Festival, McNamara performed A Quote by Frank O’Hara or Something Like That alongside Brandon Washington, Aaron Burr Johnson, Victor Lozano, and Oisín Monaghan. McNamara also curated a group exhibition at Baby Company gallery, called "Fire" that same year. Artists included in the group exhibition were  A.L. Steiner, Cajsa von Zeipel, Kia LaBeija, Matthew Leifheit, Nicole Eisenman, Paul Sepuya, Raúl de Nieves, and Wolfgang Tillmans amongst many others.

McNamara presented a suite of new drawings and a live performance, called "The Consolations," at Company gallery in 2020.

"Before I Forgot Myself," is a 2022 exhibition at OCDChinatown that brings together a collection of artworks and video works from the artist's studio and archives over the past fifteen years.

Influences 
McNamara has a range of influences including dancer and choreographer Merce Cunningham, composer John Zorn, artist Thomas Lanigan-Schmidt, the Internet, New York's club kids, ballet, SAGE, science fiction, and more.

Selected Performances and Exhibitions 

 Before I Forgot Myself, OCD Chinatown, NY 2022
 Still Life, The Bunker, Palm Beach, FL, 2021
 Cavern of Fine Gay Wine & Video, Hauser & Wirth, NY, 2021
 The Consolations, Company Gallery, NY, 2020
 A Quote by Frank O’Hara or Something Like That, Boffo Performance Festival, Fire Island, NY, 2019
 Dyke Dads Fag Fathers, Sotheby’s, NY
 Fire, Baby Company, New York, NY
 ME3M 4 Boston, ICA Boston, Boston, MA, 2018
 Battleground, Guggenheim Museum, New York, NY, 2018
 Commedia del Arte, with John Zorn, Guggenheim Museum, New York, NY, 2017
 Awareness Raising and Befriending Schemes, Frieze Projects, New York, NY, 2017
 Divided States of America, The LGBT Center, New York, NY, 2017
 Ryan McNamara Presents: Back to School, MoMA PS1, Queens, 2016
 Several Interventions Over the Course of Two Hours, The Power Plant, Toronto, 2016
 Battleground, Guggenheim Museum, New York, NY, 2016
 Dimensions, with Dev Hynes, Perez Art Museum, Miami, FL, 2015
 The Poseurs, A Dance, with K8 Hardy, The Whitney Museum of American Art, New York, NY, 2015
 Gently Used, Mary Boone Gallery, New York, NY, 2015
 ME3M 4 Miami, Miami Grand Theater, Miami Beach, 2014
 Misty Milarky Ying Yang, The High Line, New York, NY, 2014
 Rockaway!, Rockaway Beach Club, MoMA PS1, The Rockaways, NY, 2014
 ME3M, Performa13, New York, NY, 2013
 Ryan McNamara’s Candid, Brand New Gallery, Milan, Italy, 2013
 Pose, MOVE!, SESC, Sao Paulo, Brazil, 2013
 And Introducing Ryan McNamara, Collectorspace, Istanbul, Turkey, 2013
 Still, Elizabeth Dee, New York, NY, 2012
 Moscow Biennale for Young Art, Moscow, Russia, 2012
 This Charming Man, Bulletin Board, 208 Bowery, New York, NY, 2012
 II, Watermill Performance Center, Water Mill, NY, 2011
 On Shuffle, Lehmann Maupin, New York, NY, 2011
 Card Ending in 5589, Art Basel, Miami Beach, FL, 2011
 Meditation, Repetition, Trance, Mendes Wood, Sao Paolo, Brazil, 2011
 Collaboration with Michele Abeles, Public Art Fund, New York, NY, 2011
 Jack Smith: Thank You For Explaining Me, Barbara Gladstone Gallery, New York, NY, 2011
 And Introducing Ryan McNamara, Elizabeth Dee, New York, NY, 2010
 The Whitney Houston Biennial, Whitney Museum of American Art, New York,  NY, 2010
 Greater New York, MoMA PS1, New York NY, 2010
 Forever, The Kitchen, New York, NY, 2010
 Ryan McNamara Presents: Klaus von Nichtssagend, The Musical, Klaus von Nichtssagend Gallery, New York, NY, 2009
 Stars!, Salon 94 Freemans, New York, NY, 2009
 2nd Athens Biennale, Athens, Greece, 2009
 Ryan McNamara Presents: Bernie, the Magic Lady, Art Production Fund Lab, New York, NY, 2009

Collections
Whitney Museum of American Art, New York
The Museum of Modern Art, New York

Awards and Grants 

 Foundation for Contemporary Art Grant
 ArtMatters Grant
 Performa Malcolm McClaren Award

References

1979 births
Living people
American performance artists
American contemporary artists
American gay artists
Hunter College alumni